The 7th Politburo of the Chinese Communist Party was elected at the 1st Plenary Session of the 7th Central Committee on June 19, 1945, consisting of 13 members. It was actively preceded by the 6th Politburo of the Chinese Communist Party.  There were additions to the membership in 1955.

Members (13)
Mao Zedong, Chairman of the Party Central Committee
Zhu De
Liu Shaoqi
Zhou Enlai
Ren Bishi, Secretary-General of the Party Central Committee (died in October 1950)
Chen Yun
Kang Sheng
Gao Gang (fell from power in February 1954; died in August 1954)
Peng Zhen
Dong Biwu
Lin Boqu
Zhang Wentian
Peng Dehuai

Members elected in April 1955 (2) 
at the 5th Plenary Session of the 7th Central Committee:
Lin Biao
Deng Xiaoping, Secretary-General of the Party Central Committee

References

External links 
  Leaders of the 7th CCP Central Committee

Politburo of the Chinese Communist Party
1945 in China